Kindersley is a provincial electoral district for the Legislative Assembly of Saskatchewan, Canada. Created for the 9th Saskatchewan general election as "Kerrobert-Kindersley", this constituency was renamed for the 18th Saskatchewan general election in 1975.

The largest centre in the riding is the town of Kindersley (pop. 4,571). Other communities in the district include the towns of Kerrobert, Macklin, Eatonia, and Luseland; and the villages of Denzil, Marengo, Coleville, Tramping Lake, and Major.

Members of the Legislative Assembly

Election results

|-

 
|NDP
|Peter Walker
|align="right"|907
|align="right"|16.06 
|align="right"|-4.35

|-

 
|NDP
|Sarah Connor
|align="right"|1,376
|align="right"|20.41 
|align="right"|-1.63

|-

 
|NDP
|Blair McDaid
|align="right"|1,443
|align="right"|22.05

|-

|- bgcolor="white"
 
|NDP
|Lee Pearce
|align="right"|797
|align="right"|16.81%
|align="right"|-3.60
|- bgcolor="white"
!align="left" colspan=3|Total
!align="right"|4,742
!align="right"|100.00%
!align="right"|

|-

 
|NDP
|Bill Rosher
|align="right"|1,444
|align="right"|20.41%
|align="right"|-4.04

|- bgcolor="white"
!align="left" colspan=3|Total
!align="right"|7,075
!align="right"|100.00%
!align="right"|

|-
 
| style="width: 130px"|Progressive Conservative
|Bill Boyd
|align="right"|3,980
|align="right"|50.81%
|align="right"|+11.26

 
|NDP
|Mel Karlson
|align="right"|1,915
|align="right"|24.45%
|align="right"|-4.34
|- bgcolor="white"
!align="left" colspan=3|Total
!align="right"|7,833
!align="right"|100.00%
!align="right"|

|-
 
| style="width: 130px"|Progressive Conservative
|Bill Boyd
|align="right"|2,766
|align="right"|39.55%
|align="right"|-26.11

 
|NDP
|Lorne Johnston
|align="right"|2,014
|align="right"|28.79%
|align="right"|+1.98
|- bgcolor="white"
!align="left" colspan=3|Total
!align="right"|6,994
!align="right"|100.00%
!align="right"|

|-
 
| style="width: 130px"|Progressive Conservative
|Robert Andrew
|align="right"|4,882
|align="right"|65.66%
|align="right"|-2.33
 
|NDP
|Wayne Welte
|align="right"|1,993
|align="right"|26.81%
|align="right"|+2.89

|- bgcolor="white"
!align="left" colspan=3|Total
!align="right"|7,435
!align="right"|100.00%
!align="right"|

|-
 
| style="width: 130px" |Progressive Conservative
|Robert Andrew
|align="right"|5,211
|align="right"|67.99%
|align="right"|+29.31
 
|NDP
|Wayne G. Nargang
|align="right"|1,833
|align="right"|23.92%
|align="right"|-10.39

|- bgcolor="white"
!align="left" colspan=3|Total
!align="right"|7,664
!align="right"|100.00%
!align="right"|

|-
 
| style="width: 130px"|Progressive Conservative
|Robert Andrew
|align="right"|2,774
|align="right"|38.68%
|align="right"|+6.64
 
|NDP
|David G. Thomson
|align="right"|2,461
|align="right"|34.31%
|align="right"|+2.63

|- bgcolor="white"
!align="left" colspan=3|Total
!align="right"|7,172
!align="right"|100.00%
!align="right"|

|-

|Progressive Conservative
|Bayne Secord
|align="right"|2,348
|align="right"|32.04%
|align="right"|-
 
|NDP
|Alex Taylor
|align="right"|2,322
|align="right"|31.68%
|align="right"|-11.62
|- bgcolor="white"
!align="left" colspan=3|Total
!align="right"|7,329
!align="right"|100.00%
!align="right"|

Kerrobert-Kindersley

|-
 
| style="width: 130px"|NDP
|Alex Taylor
|align="right"|3,209
|align="right"|51.57%
|align="right"|+8.27

|- bgcolor="white"
!align="left" colspan=3|Total
!align="right"|6,223
!align="right"|100.00%
!align="right"|

|-

 
|NDP
|Boyd Sadler
|align="right"|2,672
|align="right"|43.30%
|align="right"|-0.30
|- bgcolor="white"
!align="left" colspan=3|Total
!align="right"|6,171
!align="right"|100.00%
!align="right"|

|-

 
|CCF
|Eldon A. Johnson
|align="right"|2,937
|align="right"|43.60%
|align="right"|+7.61
|- bgcolor="white"
!align="left" colspan=3|Total
!align="right"|6,736
!align="right"|100.00%
!align="right"|

|-
 
| style="width: 130px"|CCF
|Eldon A. Johnson
|align="right"|2,499
|align="right"|35.99%
|align="right"|-7.63

|Prog. Conservative
|Martin E. Cole
|align="right"|858
|align="right"|12.36%
|align="right"|-
|- bgcolor="white"
!align="left" colspan=3|Total
!align="right"|6,943
!align="right"|100.00%
!align="right"|

|-
 
| style="width: 130px"|CCF
|Eldon A. Johnson
|align="right"|3,000
|align="right"|43.62%
|align="right"|-14.11

|- bgcolor="white"
!align="left" colspan=3|Total
!align="right"|6,878
!align="right"|100.00%
!align="right"|

|-
 
| style="width: 130px"|CCF
|John Wellbelove
|align="right"|3,534
|align="right"|57.73%
|align="right"|+13.59

|- bgcolor="white"
!align="left" colspan=3|Total
!align="right"|6,122
!align="right"|100.00%
!align="right"|

|-
 
| style="width: 130px"|CCF
|John Wellbelove
|align="right"|3,333
|align="right"|44.14%
|align="right"|-5.30

|- bgcolor="white"
!align="left" colspan=3|Total
!align="right"|7,551
!align="right"|100.00%
!align="right"|

|-
 
| style="width: 130px"|CCF
|John Wellbelove
|align="right"|3,236
|align="right"|49.44%
|align="right"|+31.87

|Prog. Conservative
|Wellington S. Myers
|align="right"|933
|align="right"|14.25%
|align="right"|–
|- bgcolor="white"
!align="left" colspan=3|Total
!align="right"|6,546
!align="right"|100.00%
!align="right"|

|-

 
|CCF
|Frank Jaenicke
|align="right"|1,201
|align="right"|17.57%
|align="right"|–
|- bgcolor="white"
!align="left" colspan=3|Total
!align="right"|6,835
!align="right"|100.00%
!align="right"|

References

External links
Website of the Legislative Assembly of Saskatchewan

Saskatchewan provincial electoral districts